Edward Gee may refer to:
Edward Gee (priest, born 1657) (1657–1730), English churchman
Edward Gee (priest, born 1565) (1565–1618), English cleric and academic
Edward Gee of Eccleston (1613–1660), English presbyterian minister
Edward Pritchard Gee (1904–1968), Anglo-Indian tea-planter and naturalist in Assam